Takia are a traditional watercraft of Fiji. They are a type of outrigger canoe that is smaller than a camakau, which in turn is smaller than a drua. A takia hull is a dugout made from any suitable wood. They rarely have sails, and do not feature a centreboard. An oar is used as a rudder.

References

Canoes
Multihulls
Water transport in Fiji